"Blue and Lonesome" is a 1949 song recorded by Memphis Slim. It was his second major R&B chart hit after "Messin' Around".

In 2016 the Rolling Stones released an album of cover songs titled Blue & Lonesome, on which a cover of the original Memphis Slim song appears.

References

1949 songs
Memphis Slim songs
Songs written by Little Walter